The Battle of Cabra took place in 1079 in southern Iberia (now Spain) between two Islamic states, Granada and Seville. Each side was aided by Castilian knights under Alfonso VI. It resulted in a victory for El Cid (Rodrigo Díaz), who routed the invading forces of Emir Abd Allah of Granada and his Christian allies led by Count García Ordóñez. El Cid captured Ordóñez and other Christian knights and held them for three days until releasing them to return to Castile.

References

Cabra
11th century in Al-Andalus
Cabra
Cabra
1079 in Europe
El Cid
Cabra
Cabra
Taifa of Granada
Taifa of Seville
History of the province of Córdoba, Spain